Alan Richard Sutherland (4 January 1944 – 4 May 2020) was a New Zealand rugby union player. A number 8 and lock, Sutherland represented Marlborough at a provincial level, and was a member of the New Zealand national side, the All Blacks, from 1968 to 1976. He played 64 matches for the All Blacks, of which three were as captain, including 10 internationals.

Sutherland died in South Africa on 4 May 2020.

References

1944 births
2020 deaths
Rugby union players from Blenheim, New Zealand
People educated at Marlborough Boys' College
New Zealand rugby union players
New Zealand international rugby union players
Marlborough rugby union players
Rhodesian rugby union players
Rugby union locks
Rugby union number eights